The Neta U (哪吒U) is an electric compact crossover produced by Hozon Auto after 2019 under the Neta (Nezha) brand, a Chinese all-electric car marque, manufactured by the Zhejiang Hezhong New Energy Automobile Company.

Overview

Hozon Auto launched the Neta U during the 2019 Shanghai Auto Show in April 2019, with the pre-sale price range ranging from 150,000 to 210,000RMB (~US21,698 – US$30,377) including subsidy in Chinese market. Hozon's Neta U crossover was built on Hozon Auto's EPT2.0 platform, which is Hozon's second generation powertrain platform.

The Neta U was originally previewed as the Hozon U pre-production concept at launch and was changed to Neta U in August 2018.

The Hozon U all-electric crossover went on sale at the end of 2019.

The Airways U5 is expected to have a starting price of 150,000 yuan to 210,000 yuan.

Neta U-Saloon
The Neta U-saloon is a purpose-built version of the Neta U revealed in December 2020 designed for vehicles for hire services. The model features a 4-seater configuration removing the front passenger seat, and interior features includes adjustable rear seats, foot rests for the rear passengers, a large projector screen, wireless charging for the back seats, and extra storage and cup holders. The prototype on display also features a sliding door that opens forward. The model is available in China in 2021.

See also

Jaguar I-Pace
Audi e-tron
 Mercedes-Benz EQC
 Tesla Model Y
 NIO ES6
 Byton M-Byte

References

Production electric cars
Cars introduced in 2019
Front-wheel-drive vehicles
All-wheel-drive vehicles
Crossover sport utility vehicles
Compact sport utility vehicles